The 1956–57 Egyptian Premier League, was the 7th season of the Egyptian Premier League, the top Egyptian professional league for association football clubs, since its establishment in 1948. The season started on 31 August 1956 and concluded on 9 June 1957.
Defending champions Al Ahly won their 7th consecutive and 7th overall Egyptian Premier League title in the club history.

League table 

 (C)= Champions, (R)= Relegated, Pld = Matches played; W = Matches won; D = Matches drawn; L = Matches lost; F = Goals for; A = Goals against; ± = Goal difference; Pts = Points.

References

External links 
 All Egyptian Competitions Info
 season info

5
1956–57 in African association football leagues
1956–57 in Egyptian football